The Vauquelin class was a group of six large destroyers built for the French Navy in the early 1930s. Entering service in 1933–1934, the sister ships spent most of their careers in the Mediterranean. During the Spanish Civil War of 1936–1939, they helped to enforce the non-intervention agreement. When France declared war on Germany in September 1939, all of the Vauquelins were assigned to the High Sea Forces ( (FHM)) which was tasked to escort French convoys and support the other commands as needed. The others returned to the Mediterranean in time to participate in Operation Vado, a bombardment of Italian coastal facilities after Italy entered the war in June.

The Vichy French reformed the FHM after the French surrender in late June. After the Allies invaded French Lebanon and Syria in June 1941,  was ordered to ferry ammunition there. Sunk en route, the ship was replaced by her sister  which successfully delivered the ammunition and then attempted to transport reinforcements and supplies to Lebanon. The four surviving ships were scuttled in Toulon when the Germans occupied Vichy France in November 1942. They were not successfully salvaged during the war and their wrecks were broken up well after the war.

Design and description

Like their predecessors, the s of the Vauquelin class were designed as fleet scouts, intended to fight their way through the enemy's screen. The design was virtually identical to the preceding s, although the stern was reshaped to improve minelaying and the torpedo armament was revised. To reduce topweight, the use of electric welding for non-strength parts of the hull and superstructure was increased as was the use of duralumin for internal partitions and parts of the superstructure. The Vauquelins were considered to be good seaboats, although the small rudder, carried over from the earlier ships, made them not very maneuverable. In service the use of duralumin was much criticized as it was corrosion prone and required much maintenance.

Their hull was subdivided by a dozen traverse bulkheads into 13 watertight compartments. Their crew consisted of 10 officers and 201 crewmen in peacetime and 12 officers and 220 enlisted men in wartime.

The ships were fitted with two  turbo generators in the engine rooms. In addition, a pair of  diesel generators were located in the central superstructure.

Armament and fire control

The main armament of the Vauquelin-class ships consisted of five 40-caliber  Modèle 1927 guns in single shielded mounts, one superfiring pair fore and aft of the superstructure and the fifth gun abaft the aft funnel. The guns were numbered '1' to '5' from front to rear. The Vauquelins could stow 200 rounds for each gun, plus 75 star shells for No. 2 gun.

Their secondary armament consisted of four 50-caliber semi-automatic  Modèle 1925 anti-aircraft (AA) guns in single mounts positioned amidships. Firing  projectiles at a muzzle velocity of  the guns had a rate of fire of 20 rounds per minute. In addition there were two twin mounts for Hotchkiss Mitrailleuse de  CA Modèle 1929 AA machine guns on the forecastle deck abreast the bridge.

The ships carried two above-water twin mounts for  torpedo tubes, one pair on each broadside between each pair of funnels as well as one triple mount aft of the rear pair of funnels able to traverse to both sides. A pair of depth charge chutes were built into their stern; these housed a total of sixteen  depth charges, with eight more in reserve. They were also fitted with a pair of depth-charge throwers, one on each broadside abreast the aft funnels, for which they carried a dozen  depth charges. The ships could be fitted with rails to drop forty  Breguet B4 mines. With a de-emphasis on anti-submarine warfare for the s, the depth-charge throwers were removed in 1936 and more 200-kilogram depth charges were carried in their place.

Fire control for the main guns was provided by a Mle 1929 electro-mechanical fire-control computer that used data provided by a  SOM B.1926 coincidence rangefinder atop the bridge. The computer could not compensate for the ships' motions and the guns could only be fired accurately when the ships were level. The rangefinder was replaced by a  OPL Mle E.1930 stereoscopic rangefinder in 1934 and the SOM rangefinder was repositioned to the base of the mainmast. The following year, Cassard was the test ship for a new  OPL E.1935 rangefinder in a two-man turret and an auxiliary Mle 1919 fire-control computer in the base of the turret. With the trial being successful, the new rangefinder in its turret replaced the E.1930 rangefinder in the rest of the Vauquelins in 1935–1936, although the latter was transferred to a new turret built around the base of the mainmast.

Wartime modifications
The  reconsidered its anti-submarine warfare tactics after the war began in September and intended to reinstate the depth-charge throwers, although these were an older model than the one previously installed. Depth-charge stowage now consisted of 24 heavy depth charges and 16 of the 100-kilogram ones for those ships that received the throwers. There was a shortage of them and only , Vauquelin and  received them beginning in May 1940. As an interim measure, a pair of rails were installed on the stern for  depth charges. Each rail could accommodate three depth charges and ten more were stored in the magazine. The Vauquelin-class ships were allocated British Alpha 128 Asdic systems in April 1940, although they were slowly installed on the surviving ships between May and the end of 1941; Le Chevalier Paul did not receive one before her loss in June 1941.

In May 1940, Vauquelin and Kersaint received a pair of twin-gun 37-millimeter mounts; the former lost all of her 37-millimeter guns in exchange while the latter retained a pair of her single mounts. Beginning in 1941 the Vauquelins had their anti-aircraft armament augmented, although shortages mean that most of the ships differed from each other. In general, the mainmast and the auxiliary fire-control position was replaced by a platform for a single 37-millimeter twin-gun mount and two of the single 37-millimeter mounts were transferred to the platform while the other two single mounts were removed. In addition each ship received two or four Browning 13.2-millimeter AA machine guns. Le Chevalier Pauls refit in January 1941 was the first to be completed and she had four 37-millimeter guns in a twin-gun mount and two singles, two single mounts for the Brownings and her original four Hotchkiss machine guns in a pair of twin-gun mounts. This was also the configuration for Tartu and Cassard. Vauquelin kept her two twin-gun 37-millimeter mounts and her original Hotchkiss mounts, and added three single Brownings. Kersaint reverted to her four original single 37-millimeter mounts, but exchanged her Hotchkiss guns for four single Brownings and also received three  Hotchkiss Modèle 1925 AA guns in single mounts.

Ships

Service
 
Kersaint, Vauquelin, and Maillé Brézé were initially assigned to the 2nd Squadron, based in Brest while the other three were sent to the 1st Squadron in Toulon. All six ships were consolidated in the 1st Squadron in October 1934. After the start of the Spanish Civil War in July 1936, Kersaint and Cassard were among the ships assigned to evacuate French citizens from Spain and later to patrol the surveillance zones assigned to France.

When France declared war on 3 September, the reorganization was ordered and the 3rd Light Squadron, which included the 5th and 9th Scout Divisions with all of the Vauquelin-class ships, was assigned to the 3rd Squadron. The ships of the 9th Scout Division were assigned to escort duties in the Western Mediterranean in early October, although they occasionally escorted ships in the Atlantic as well. Cassard was detached for several months to help search for German commerce raiders and blockade runners in the Atlantic. Vauquelin and Maillé Brézé escorted a pair of cruisers to Dakar, French West Africa, in October and then escorted a convoy back.

In April 1940 the 5th Scout Division with Le Chevalier Paul, Tartu and Maillé Brézé was tasked to escort convoys between Scotland and Norway. Beginning in mid-April they escorted two French troop convoys to Harstad and Namsos. Maillé Brézé was lost on 30 April after a torpedo accident at Greenock, Scotland. The remaining ships rejoined their sisters at Toulon at the end of May in anticipation of Italy joining the war. Four days after the Italians declared war on 10 June, Tartu, Cassard and Le Chevalier Paul were among the ships ordered to bombard targets in Vado Ligure. Little damage was inflicted despite the expenditure of over 1,600 rounds and two Italian MAS boats that attempted to intervene were only lightly damaged by the French.

Kersaint was present when the British attacked the French ships in Mers-el-Kébir, French Algeria, in July, but was not damaged. Le Chevalier Paul, Vauquelin and Tartu replaced three older  in the FHM on 15 November. After the Allies invaded French Lebanon and Syria in June 1941, Le Chevalier Paul was dispatched to Lebanon with more ammunition for the ships there. She was sunk by British torpedo bombers en route on 16 June and Vauquelin sailed from Toulon the following day. She reached Beirut four days later; on the 29th, all three of the  based there sailed for Greece to load reinforcements and supplies bound for Lebanon. They were spotted by British aircraft on their way back to Lebanon in early July and turned back in accordance with their orders. In the meantime, Tartu, Cassard and a heavy cruiser transported a battalion of infantry from Algiers, French Algeria, to Marseilles between 30 June and 1 July that was intended to reinforce the Levant.

After the Allies invaded French North Africa on 8 November 1942, the Germans attempted to capture the French ships in Toulon intact on 27 November, but the four surviving sisters were scuttled by their crews. The Germans and Italians made only cursory attempts to salvage the ships, not least because three were further damaged during Allied air attacks in 1944 and they were scrapped in place between 1950 and 1956.

Notes

References

External links 
 Vauquelin-class at uboat.net

Destroyer classes
World War II destroyers of France
 
Ship classes of the French Navy